Sheykhzamanli is an Azerbaijani surname.

Notable people with this surname include:

 Naghi Sheykhzamanli (1883–1967), Azerbaijani politician
 Mammadbaghir Sheykhzamanli (1880–1920), Azerbaijani politician

Azerbaijani-language surnames